Shaun Ata is a New Zealand rugby league player who played professionally in Australia and England.

Playing career
Ata played for the Hibiscus Coast Raiders in the Bartercard Cup. In 2004 he joined the Penrith Panthers. Although he did not play first grade he did play in the 2004 World Sevens.

In 2006 he played for the London Skolars. He later returned to New Zealand, playing for Harbour League in the Bartercard Cup and representing New Zealand Māori in their tour of the Cook Islands.

Ata then returned to playing for the Hibiscus Coast Raiders. He was their player of the year in 2011 and played at fullback in the 2012 Grand Final victory.

References

New Zealand rugby league players
New Zealand Māori rugby league players
New Zealand Māori rugby league team players
Hibiscus Coast Raiders players
North Harbour rugby league team players
London Skolars players
Rugby league wingers
Rugby league centres
Living people
Year of birth missing (living people)